Justice Amal Kumar Sarkar (29 June 1901 – 18 December 2001) was the eighth Chief Justice of India, from 16 March 1966 up to his retirement on 29 June 1966.

Education
He studied at the prestigious Scottish Churches College, the Bangabasi College, and at the University Law College, all affiliated with the University of Calcutta.

Life 
He started his career by practising as an advocate in the Calcutta High Court at Kolkata. He became a judge at the Calcutta High Court in January 1949, and went on to practice until March 1957.

References 

 Biography on Supreme Court website
Reference to the "late A.K. Sarkar"

Judges of the Calcutta High Court
20th-century Indian judges
Chief justices of India
Scottish Church College alumni
Bangabasi College alumni
University of Calcutta alumni
1901 births
Year of death missing
20th-century Indian lawyers